The 2015 Wyre Forest District Council election took place on 7 May 2015 to elect members of Wyre Forest District Council in Worcestershire, England. The whole council was up for election after boundary changes reduced the number of seats by nine. The Conservative Party gained overall control of the council from no overall control.

Background
After the last election in 2014 no party had a majority on Wyre Forest District Council. The Conservatives were the largest party with 15 councillors, while Labour had 9, Health Concern 7, the UK Independence Party 5, independents 4 and there were 2 Liberals. Following the election the Conservatives formed an alliance with the 4 independents and 2 Liberals to run the council with exactly half of the seats.

In June 2014 Mike Price defected from the Liberal Party to the Conservatives, meaning that Fran Oborski was left as the only Liberal councillor. By the time of the 2015 election the Conservative group had increased to 17 councillors, as independent Julian Phillips joined the party.

The whole of Wyre Forest District Council was elected in 2015 after boundary changes reduced the number of wards from 17 to 12 and the number of councillors from 42 to 33. These changes meant ten wards elected three councillors each, while one ward elected two councillors and one ward elected a single councillor. However the election in the Areley Kings and Riverside ward was delayed until June 2015 after the death of one of the candidates.

Four councillors stood down and did not seek re-election in 2015, Douglas Godwin, Pauline Hayward, Lynn Hyde and Mike Kelly.

Election result
The Conservatives gained a majority on the council after winning 21 of the 30 seats contested on 7 May. Both Labour and Health Concern were reduced to two seats on the council, while the UK Independence Party only won one seat. Among those to lose seats were the leader of the UK Independence Party on the council, Michael Wrench, and the Health Concern mayor of Stourport, Cliff Brewer. Independents won all three seats in Aggborough and Spennells, while Fran Oborski was re-elected as the only Liberal councillor.

Opposition candidates were concerned that the reduction in the number of polling stations after the boundary changes had resulted in long queues to vote.

After the delayed election in Areley Kings and Riverside resulted in two Conservatives and one Labour councillors being elected, the Conservatives had 23 seats and Labour had 3 seats.

The above results include the delayed election in Areley Kings and Riverside.

Ward results

Areley Kings and Riverside delayed election
The election in Areley Kings and Riverside ward took place on 9 June 2015, delayed from 7 May when the rest of the council voted. This came after the death of a Health Concern candidate for the ward and former councillor for Areley Kings, Nigel Thomas, on 12 April.

Conservatives Ken and Lin Henderson won two of the three seats, while the Labour group leader Jamie Shaw was also elected. There was a recount after Lin Henderson took the third seat, three votes ahead of Labour's Vi Higgs. Meanwhile, the failure of Health Concern to win seats in the ward meant that they had no councillors for Stourport for the first time in over a decade.

By-elections between 2015 and 2016
A by-election took place in Blakebrook and Habberley South on 24 September 2015 after the resignation of Conservative councillor Ruth Gregory due to ill health.

References

2015
2015 English local elections
May 2015 events in the United Kingdom
2010s in Worcestershire